Salt pond or Saltpond may refer to:

Types of salt ponds
 Salt evaporation pond, an artificial salt pond
 Tropical salt pond ecosystem, a natural salt pond ecosystem
 Salt pan (geology), desert feature with occasional salt ponds

Places
 Saltpond, a town in the Central Region of South Ghana, West Africa
 Salt Pond Township, Saline County, Missouri
 Salt Pond Mountain, in Giles County, Virginia

See also
 Great Salt Pond (disambiguation)